A list of films produced in the Soviet Union in 1948 (see 1948 in film).

1948

See also
1948 in the Soviet Union

External links
 Soviet films of 1948 at the Internet Movie Database

1948
Soviet
Films